The 1986–87 Tulsa Golden Hurricane men's basketball team represented the University of Tulsa as a member of the Missouri Valley Conference during the 1986–87 college basketball season. The Golden Hurricane played their home games at the Tulsa Convention Center. Led by head coach J. D. Barnett, they finished the season 22–8 overall and 11–3 in conference play to finish atop the MVC standings. The Golden Hurricane lost in the championship game of the MVC tournament, but did receive an at-large bid to the NCAA tournament as the No. 11 seed in the West region. Tulsa lost to No. 6 seed Oklahoma in the opening round.

Roster

Schedule and results

|-
!colspan=9 style=| Regular season

|-
!colspan=9 style=| MVC Tournament

|-
!colspan=9 style=| NCAA Tournament

References

Tulsa Golden Hurricane men's basketball seasons
Tulsa
Tulsa Golden Hurricane men's b
Tulsa Golden Hurricane men's b
Tulsa